This is a list of destinations that Frontier Airlines currently serves. Cities served by a codeshare agreement with Volaris are not included in this list. Apple Vacations and Fun Jet Vacations destinations, operated by Frontier, are also not included.

Destinations

Terminated destinations

References

External links
 FlyFrontier

Lists of airline destinations